Concord School District is a public school district located in Concord, New Hampshire, U.S. The district serves about 5,400 students in seven schools.

Schools

High schools
Concord High School

Middle schools
Rundlett Middle School

Elementary schools
Abbot-Downing School
Beaver Meadow School
Broken Ground School
Christa McAuliffe School
Mill Brook School

School Board

References

External links

 
School districts in New Hampshire